Greg Behrendt's Wake-Up Call was an American reality television series that premiered on SoapNet on January 8, 2009. The series was hosted by stand-up comedian and author Greg Behrendt.

The series, like Behrendt's previous effort (a daily syndicated talk show), specialized in dealing with couples and their relationship problems. The major difference between Wake-Up Call and The Greg Behrendt Show was that the relationships were dealt with in person rather than in a television studio.

Originally, Wake-Up Call was supposed to air on ABC in the 2006–2007 season, as the six-episode series was scheduled to be a midseason replacement. However, ABC never aired the episodes and the series sat unaired for two years until corporate sibling SoapNet began airing the series. The final episode aired on February 12.

References

2000s American reality television series
2009 American television series debuts
2009 American television series endings
Soapnet original programming